Vaught is a surname, and may refer to:

 BC Vaught, drummer for Hed PE
 DeAnn Vaught, member of the Arkansas House of Representatives
 James B. Vaught, United States Army Lieutenant General
 Johnny Vaught, American college football player
 Loy Vaught, American basketball player
 Robert Lawson Vaught, American mathematical logician

See also
 Vaughn (disambiguation)
 Big V